Leipzig-Lindenau is a railway station located in Leipzig, Germany. The station is located on the Leipzig–Probstzella railway. The train services are operated by Deutsche Bahn. Since December 2013 the station is served by the S-Bahn Mitteldeutschland.

References

External links
 

Lindenau
Railway stations in Germany opened in 1969